Gerhardsen is a Norwegian surname meaning 'son of Gerhard'. The given name Gerhard or Gerhart is a Germanic Masculine name commonly given in Scandinavia. Notable people with the surname include:

Carin Gerhardsen (born 1962), Swedish author of crime fiction
Einar Gerhardsen (1897–1987), Norwegian politician
Gerhard Meidell Gerhardsen (1848–1912), Norwegian bailiff and politician
Gerhard Meidell Gerhardsen (1885–1931), Norwegian bailiff and politician
Gerhard Meidell Gerhardsen (economist) (1912–1986), Norwegian economist
Marte Gerhardsen (born 1972), Norwegian civil servant, politician and organizational leader
Mina Gerhardsen (born 1975), Norwegian politician 
Rolf Gerhardsen (1902–1971), Norwegian journalist and politician
Rune Gerhardsen (born 1946), Norwegian politician
Werna Gerhardsen (1912–1970), Norwegian politician